This is a list of franchise records for the Chicago Blackhawks of the National Hockey League.

Team records

Single season

Single game

Streaks

Individual records

Career

Season

Single game

¹ NHL Record

² Minimum 70-game schedule

See also
List of Chicago Blackhawks players
List of NHL statistical leaders
List of NHL players

Notes and references

 blackhawks.nhl.com

Records
National Hockey League statistical records
Rec